Manhattan Hill is a high-rise development located in the Lai Chi Kok district of Kowloon in Hong Kong, formerly Kowloon Motor Bus Lai Chi Kok Depot. The complex consists of five towers. The entire complex was developed by Sun Hung Kai Properties and was completed in January 2007.

Buildings of the complex

See also
List of tallest buildings in Hong Kong

References

Buildings and structures completed in 2007
Residential skyscrapers in Hong Kong
Lai Chi Kok
Private housing estates in Hong Kong
Sun Hung Kai Properties